Terence Kemp McKenna (November 16, 1946 – April 3, 2000) was an American ethnobotanist and mystic who advocated the responsible use of naturally occurring psychedelic plants. He spoke and wrote about a variety of subjects, including psychedelic drugs, plant-based entheogens, shamanism, metaphysics, alchemy, language, philosophy, culture, technology, environmentalism, and the theoretical origins of human consciousness. He was called the "Timothy Leary of the '90s", "one of the leading authorities on the ontological foundations of shamanism", and the "intellectual voice of rave culture".

McKenna formulated a concept about the nature of time based on fractal patterns he claimed to have discovered in the I Ching, which he called novelty theory, proposing that this predicted the end of time, and a transition of consciousness in the year 2012. His promotion of novelty theory and its connection to the Maya calendar is credited as one of the factors leading to the widespread beliefs about the 2012 phenomenon. Novelty theory is considered pseudoscience.

Biography

Early life

Terence McKenna was born and raised in Paonia, Colorado,
with Irish ancestry on his father's side of the family.

McKenna developed a hobby of fossil-hunting in his youth and from this he acquired a deep scientific appreciation of nature. He also became interested in psychology at a young age, reading Carl Jung's book Psychology and Alchemy at the age of 14. This was the same age McKenna first became aware of magic mushrooms, when reading an essay titled "Seeking the Magic Mushroom" which appeared in the May 13, 1957 edition of LIFE magazine.

At age 16 McKenna moved to Los Altos, California to live with family friends for a year. He finished high school in Lancaster, California. In 1963, he was introduced to the literary world of psychedelics through The Doors of Perception and Heaven and Hell by Aldous Huxley and certain issues of The Village Voice which published articles on psychedelics.

McKenna said that one of his early psychedelic experiences with morning glory seeds showed him "that there was something there worth pursuing", and in interviews he claimed to have smoked cannabis daily since his teens.

Studying and traveling
In 1965, McKenna enrolled in the University of California, Berkeley and was accepted into the Tussman Experimental College. While in college in 1967 he began studying shamanism through the study of Tibetan folk religion. That same year, which he called his "opium and kabbala phase", he traveled to Jerusalem where he met Kathleen Harrison, an ethnobotanist who later became his wife.

In 1969, McKenna traveled to Nepal led by his interest in Tibetan painting and hallucinogenic shamanism. He sought out shamans of the Tibetan Bon tradition, trying to learn more about the shamanic use of visionary plants. During his time there, he also studied the Tibetan language and worked as a hashish smuggler, until "one of his Bombay-to-Aspen shipments fell into the hands of U. S. Customs." He then wandered through southeast Asia viewing ruins, and spent time as a professional butterfly collector in Indonesia.

After his mother's death from cancer in 1970, McKenna, his brother Dennis, and three friends traveled to the Colombian Amazon in search of oo-koo-hé, a plant preparation containing dimethyltryptamine (DMT). Instead of oo-koo-hé they found fields full of gigantic Psilocybe cubensis mushrooms, which became the new focus of the expedition. In La Chorrera, at the urging of his brother, McKenna was the subject of a psychedelic experiment in which the brothers attempted to bond harmine (harmine is another psychedelic compound they used synergistically with the mushrooms) with their own neural DNA, through the use of a set specific vocal techniques. They hypothesised this would give them access to the collective memory of the human species, and would manifest the alchemists' Philosopher's Stone which they viewed as a "hyperdimensional union of spirit and matter". McKenna claimed the experiment put him in contact with "Logos": an informative, divine voice he believed was universal to visionary religious experience. McKenna also often referred to the voice as "the mushroom", and "the teaching voice" amongst other names. The voice's reputed revelations and his brother's simultaneous peculiar psychedelic experience prompted him to explore the structure of an early form of the I Ching, which led to his "Novelty Theory".
During their stay in the Amazon, McKenna also became romantically involved with his interpreter, Ev.

In 1972, McKenna returned to U.C. Berkeley to finish his studies and in 1975, he graduated with a degree in ecology, shamanism, and conservation of natural resources. In the autumn of 1975, after parting with his girlfriend Ev earlier in the year, McKenna began a relationship with his future wife and the mother of his two children, Kathleen Harrison.

Soon after graduating, McKenna and Dennis published a book inspired by their Amazon experiences, The Invisible Landscape: Mind, Hallucinogens and the I Ching. The brothers' experiences in the Amazon were the main focus of McKenna's book True Hallucinations, published in 1993. McKenna also began lecturing locally around Berkeley and started appearing on some underground radio stations.

Psilocybin mushroom cultivation

McKenna, along with his brother Dennis, developed a technique for cultivating psilocybin mushrooms using spores they brought to America from the Amazon. In 1976, the brothers published what they had learned in the book Psilocybin: Magic Mushroom Grower's Guide, under the pseudonyms "O.T. Oss" and "O.N. Oeric". McKenna and his brother were the first to come up with a reliable method for cultivating psilocybin mushrooms at home. As ethnobiologist Jonathan Ott explains, "[the] authors adapted San Antonio's technique (for producing edible mushrooms by casing mycelial cultures on a rye grain substrate; San Antonio 1971) to the production of Psilocybe [Stropharia] cubensis. The new technique involved the use of ordinary kitchen implements, and for the first time the layperson was able to produce a potent entheogen in his [or her] own home, without access to sophisticated technology, equipment, or chemical supplies." When the 1986 revised edition was published, the Magic Mushroom Grower's Guide had sold over 100,000 copies.

Mid- to later life

Public speaking
In the early 1980s, McKenna began to speak publicly on the topic of psychedelic drugs, becoming one of the pioneers of the psychedelic movement. His main focus was on the plant-based psychedelics such as psilocybin mushrooms (which were the catalyst for his career), ayahuasca, cannabis, and the plant derivative DMT. He conducted lecture tours and workshops promoting natural psychedelics as a way to explore universal mysteries, stimulate the imagination, and re-establish a harmonious relationship with nature. Though associated with the New Age and Human Potential Movements, McKenna himself had little patience for New Age sensibilities. He repeatedly stressed the importance and primacy of the "felt presence of direct experience", as opposed to dogma.

In addition to psychedelic drugs, McKenna spoke on a wide array of subjects, including shamanism; metaphysics; alchemy; language; culture; self-empowerment; environmentalism, techno-paganism; artificial intelligence; evolution; extraterrestrials; science and scientism; the Web; virtual reality (which he saw as a way to artistically communicate the experience of psychedelics); and aesthetic theory, specifically about art/visual experience as information representing the significance of hallucinatory visions experienced under the influence of psychedelics.

McKenna soon became a fixture of popular counterculture with Timothy Leary once introducing him as "one of the five or six most important people on the planet" and with comedian Bill Hicks' referencing him in his stand-up act and building an entire routine around his ideas. McKenna also became a popular personality in the psychedelic rave/dance scene of the early 1990s, with frequent spoken word performances at raves and contributions to psychedelic and goa trance albums by The Shamen, Spacetime Continuum, Alien Project, Capsula, Entheogenic, Zuvuya, Shpongle, and Shakti Twins. In 1994 he appeared as a speaker at the Starwood Festival, documented in the book Tripping by Charles Hayes.

McKenna published several books in the early-to-mid-1990s including: The Archaic Revival; Food of the Gods; and True Hallucinations. Hundreds of hours of McKenna's public lectures were recorded either professionally or bootlegged and have been produced on cassette tape, CD and MP3. Segments of his talks have gone on to be sampled by many musicians and DJ's.

McKenna was a colleague and close friend of chaos mathematician Ralph Abraham, and author and biologist Rupert Sheldrake. He conducted several public and many private debates with them from 1982 until his death. These debates were known as trialogues and some of the discussions were later published in the books: Trialogues at the Edge of the West and The Evolutionary Mind.

Botanical Dimensions

In 1985, McKenna founded Botanical Dimensions with his then-wife, Kathleen Harrison. Botanical Dimensions is a nonprofit ethnobotanical preserve on the Big Island of Hawaii, established to collect, protect, propagate, and understand plants of ethno-medical significance and their lore, and appreciate, study, and educate others about plants and mushrooms felt to be significant to cultural integrity and spiritual well-being. The  botanical garden is a repository containing thousands of plants that have been used by indigenous people of the tropical regions, and includes a database of information related to their purported healing properties. McKenna was involved until 1992, when he retired from the project, following his and Kathleen's divorce earlier in the year. Kathleen still manages Botanical Dimensions as its president and projects director.

After their divorce, McKenna moved to Hawaii permanently, where he built a modernist house and created a gene bank of rare plants near his home. Previously, he had split his time between Hawaii and Occidental, CA.

Death
McKenna was a longtime sufferer of migraines, but on 22 May 1999 he began to have unusually extreme and painful headaches. He then collapsed due to a seizure. McKenna was diagnosed with glioblastoma multiforme, a highly aggressive form of brain cancer. For the next several months he underwent various treatments, including experimental gamma knife radiation treatment. According to Wired magazine, McKenna was worried that his tumor may have been caused by his psychedelic drug use, or his 35 years of daily cannabis smoking; however, his doctors assured him there was no causal relation.

In late 1999, McKenna described his thoughts concerning his impending death to interviewer Erik Davis:

McKenna died on April 3, 2000, at the age of 53.

Library fire and insect collection
On February 7, 2007, McKenna's library of over 3000 rare books and personal notes was destroyed in a fire at the Esalen Institute in Big Sur, California. An index of McKenna's library was made by his brother Dennis. His daughter, the artist and photographer Klea McKenna, subsequently preserved his insect collection, turning it into a gallery installation, and then publishing it in book form as The Butterfly Hunter, featuring her selected photos of 122 insects119 butterflies/moths and three beetles or beetle-like insectsfrom a set of over 2000 he collected between 1969 and 1972, as well as maps showing his collecting routes through the rainforests of Southeast Asia and South America. McKenna had intensively studied Lepidoptera and entomology in the 1960s, and as part of his studies hunted for butterflies primarily in Colombia and Indonesia. McKenna's insect collection was consistent with his interest in Victorian-era explorers and naturalists, and his worldview based on close observation of nature. In the 1970s, when he was still collecting, he became quite squeamish and guilt-ridden about the necessity of killing butterflies in order to collect and classify them, and that's what led him to stop his entomological studies, according to his daughter.

Thought

Psychedelics
Terence McKenna advocated the exploration of altered states of mind via the ingestion of naturally occurring psychedelic substances; for example, and in particular, as facilitated by the ingestion of high doses of psychedelic mushrooms, ayahuasca, and DMT, which he believed was the apotheosis of the psychedelic experience.
He was less enthralled with synthetic drugs, stating, "I think drugs should come from the natural world and be use-tested by shamanically orientated cultures ... one cannot predict the long-term effects of a drug produced in a laboratory."

McKenna always stressed the responsible use of psychedelic plants, saying: "Experimenters should be very careful. One must build up to the experience. These are bizarre dimensions of extraordinary power and beauty. There is no set rule to avoid being overwhelmed, but move carefully, reflect a great deal, and always try to map experiences back onto the history of the race and the philosophical and religious accomplishments of the species. All the compounds are potentially dangerous, and all compounds, at sufficient doses or repeated over time, involve risks. The library is the first place to go when looking into taking a new compound."

He also recommended, and often spoke of taking, what he called "heroic doses", which he defined as five grams of dried psilocybin mushrooms, taken alone, on an empty stomach, in silent darkness, and with eyes closed. He believed that when taken this way one could expect a profound visionary experience, believing it is only when "slain" by the power of the mushroom that the message becomes clear.

Although McKenna avoided giving his allegiance to any one interpretation (part of his rejection of monotheism), he was open to the idea of psychedelics as being "trans-dimensional travel". He proposed that DMT sent one to a "parallel dimension" and that psychedelics literally enabled an individual to encounter "higher dimensional entities", or what could be ancestors, or spirits of the Earth, saying that if you can trust your own perceptions it appears that you are entering an "ecology of souls". McKenna also put forward the idea that psychedelics were "doorways into the Gaian mind", suggesting that "the planet has a kind of intelligence, it can actually open a channel of communication with an individual human being" and that the psychedelic plants were the facilitators of this communication.

Machine elves

McKenna spoke of hallucinations while on DMT in which he claims to have met intelligent entities he described as "self-transforming machine elves".

Psilocybin panspermia speculation

In a more radical version of biophysicist Francis Crick's hypothesis of directed panspermia, McKenna speculated on the idea that psilocybin mushrooms may be a species of high intelligence, which may have arrived on this planet as spores migrating through space and which are attempting to establish a symbiotic relationship with human beings. He postulated that "intelligence, not life, but intelligence may have come here [to Earth] in this spore-bearing life form". He said, "I think that theory will probably be vindicated. I think in a hundred years if people do biology they will think it quite silly that people once thought that spores could not be blown from one star system to another by cosmic radiation pressure," and also believed that "few people are in a position to judge its extraterrestrial potential, because few people in the orthodox sciences have ever experienced the full spectrum of psychedelic effects that are unleashed."

Opposition to organized religion
McKenna was opposed to Christianity and most forms of organized religion or guru-based forms of spiritual awakening, favouring shamanism, which he believed was the broadest spiritual paradigm available, stating that:
What I think happened is that in the world of prehistory all religion was experiential, and it was based on the pursuit of ecstasy through plants. And at some time, very early, a group interposed itself between people and direct experience of the 'Other.' This created hierarchies, priesthoods, theological systems, castes, ritual, taboos. Shamanism, on the other hand, is an experiential science that deals with an area where we know nothing. It is important to remember that our epistemological tools have developed very unevenly in the West. We know a tremendous amount about what is going on in the heart of the atom, but we know absolutely nothing about the nature of the mind.

Technological singularity
During the final years of his life and career, McKenna became very engaged in the theoretical realm of technology. He was an early proponent of the technological singularity and in his last recorded public talk, Psychedelics in the age of intelligent machines, he outlined ties between psychedelics, computation technology, and humans. He also became enamored with the Internet, calling it "the birth of [the] global mind", believing it to be a place where psychedelic culture could flourish.

Admired writers
Either philosophically or religiously, he expressed admiration for Marshall McLuhan, Alfred North Whitehead, Pierre Teilhard de Chardin, Carl Jung, Plato, Gnostic Christianity, and Alchemy, while regarding the Greek philosopher Heraclitus as his favorite philosopher.

McKenna also expressed admiration for the works of writers Aldous Huxley, James Joyce, whose book Finnegans Wake he called "the quintessential work of art, or at least work of literature of the 20th century," science fiction writer Philip K. Dick, who he described as an "incredible genius," fabulist Jorge Luis Borges, with whom McKenna shared the belief that "scattered through the ordinary world there are books and artifacts and perhaps people who are like doorways into impossible realms, of impossible and contradictory truth" and Vladimir Nabokov. McKenna once said that he would have become a Nabokov lecturer if he had never encountered psychedelics.

"Stoned ape" theory of human evolution 

McKenna's hypothesis concerning the influence of psilocybin mushrooms on human evolution is known as "the 'stoned ape' theory."

In his 1992 book Food of the Gods, McKenna proposed that the transformation from humans' early ancestors Homo erectus to the species Homo sapiens mainly involved the addition of the mushroom Psilocybe cubensis in the diet, an event that according to his theory took place about 100,000 BCE (when he believed humans diverged from the genus Homo). McKenna based his theory on the effects, or alleged effects, produced by the mushroom while citing studies by Roland Fischer et al. from the late 1960s to early 1970s.

McKenna stated that, due to the desertification of the African continent at that time, human forerunners were forced from the shrinking tropical canopy into search of new food sources. He believed they would have been following large herds of wild cattle whose dung harbored the insects that, he proposed, were undoubtedly part of their new diet, and would have spotted and started eating Psilocybe cubensis, a dung-loving mushroom often found growing out of cowpats.

McKenna's hypothesis was that low doses of psilocybin improve visual acuity, particularly edge detection, meaning that the presence of psilocybin in the diet of early pack hunting primates caused the individuals who were consuming psilocybin mushrooms to be better hunters than those who were not, resulting in an increased food supply and in turn a higher rate of reproductive success. Then at slightly higher doses, he contended, the mushroom acts to sexually arouse, leading to a higher level of attention, more energy in the organism, and potential erection in the males, rendering it even more evolutionarily beneficial, as it would result in more offspring. At even higher doses, McKenna proposed that the mushroom would have acted to "dissolve boundaries," promoting community bonding and group sexual activities. Consequently, there would be a mixing of genes, greater genetic diversity, and a communal sense of responsibility for the group offspring. At these higher doses, McKenna also argued that psilocybin would be triggering activity in the "language-forming region of the brain", manifesting as music and visions, thus catalyzing the emergence of language in early hominids by expanding "their arboreally evolved repertoire of troop signals." He also pointed out that psilocybin would dissolve the ego and "religious concerns would be at the forefront of the tribe's consciousness, simply because of the power and strangeness of the experience itself."

According to McKenna, access to and ingestion of mushrooms was an evolutionary advantage to humans' omnivorous hunter-gatherer ancestors, also providing humanity's first religious impulse. He believed that psilocybin mushrooms were the "evolutionary catalyst" from which language, projective imagination, the arts, religion, philosophy, science, and all of human culture sprang.

Criticism
McKenna's "stoned ape" theory has not received attention from the scientific community and has been criticized for a relative lack of citation to any of the paleoanthropological evidence informing our understanding of human origins. His ideas regarding psilocybin and visual acuity have been criticized as misrepresentations of Fischer et al.'s findings, who published studies of visual perception parameters other than acuity. Criticism has also noted a separate study on psilocybin-induced transformation of visual space, wherein Fischer et al. stated that psilocybin "may not be conducive to the survival of the organism". There is a lack of scientific evidence that psilocybin increases sexual arousal, and even if it does, it would not necessarily entail an evolutionary advantage. Others have pointed to civilizations such as the Aztecs, who used psychedelic mushrooms (at least among the Priestly class), that didn't reflect McKenna's model of how psychedelic-using cultures would behave, for example, by carrying out human sacrifice. There are also examples of Amazonian tribes such as the Jivaro and the Yanomami who use ayahuasca ceremoniously and who are known to engage in violent behaviour. This, it has been argued, indicates the use of psychedelic plants does not necessarily suppress the ego and create harmonious societies.

Archaic revival
One of the main themes running through McKenna's work, and the title of his second book, was the idea that Western civilization was undergoing what he called an "archaic revival".

His hypothesis was that Western society has become "sick" and is undergoing a "healing process": In the same way that the human body begins to produce antibodies when it feels itself to be sick, humanity as a collective whole (in the Jungian sense) was creating "strategies for overcoming the condition of disease" and trying to cure itself, by what he termed as "a reversion to archaic values." McKenna pointed to phenomena including surrealism, abstract expressionism, body piercing and tattooing, psychedelic drug use, sexual permissiveness, jazz, experimental dance, rave culture, rock and roll and catastrophe theory, amongst others, as his evidence that this process was underway. This idea is linked to McKenna's "stoned ape" theory of human evolution, with him viewing the "archaic revival" as an impulse to return to the symbiotic and blissful relationship he believed humanity once had with the psilocybin mushroom.

In differentiating his idea from the "New Age", a term that he felt trivialized the significance of the next phase in human evolution, McKenna stated that: "The New Age is essentially humanistic psychology '80s-style, with the addition of neo-shamanism, channeling, crystal and herbal healing. The archaic revival is a much larger, more global phenomenon that assumes that we are recovering the social forms of the late neolithic, and reaches far back in the 20th century to Freud, to surrealism, to abstract expressionism, even to a phenomenon like National Socialism which is a negative force. But the stress on ritual, on organized activity, on race/ancestor-consciousness – these are themes that have been worked out throughout the entire 20th century, and the archaic revival is an expression of that."

Novelty theory and Timewave Zero

Novelty theory is a pseudoscientific idea that purports to predict the ebb and flow of novelty in the universe as an inherent quality of time, proposing that time is not a constant but has various qualities tending toward either "habit" or "novelty". Habit, in this context, can be thought of as entropic, repetitious, or conservative; and novelty as creative, disjunctive, or progressive phenomena. McKenna's idea was that the universe is an engine designed for the production and conservation of novelty and that as novelty increases, so does complexity. With each level of complexity achieved becoming the platform for a further ascent into complexity.

The basis of the theory was conceived in the mid-1970s after McKenna's experiences with psilocybin mushrooms at La Chorrera in the Amazon led him to closely study the King Wen sequence of the I Ching.

In Asian Taoist philosophy, opposing phenomena are represented by the yin and yang. Both are always present in everything, yet the amount of influence of each varies over time. The individual lines of the I Ching are made up of both Yin (broken lines) and Yang (solid lines).

When examining the King Wen sequence of 64 hexagrams, McKenna noticed a pattern. He analysed the "degree of difference" between the hexagrams in each successive pair and claimed he found a statistical anomaly, which he believed suggested that the King Wen sequence was intentionally constructed, with the sequence of hexagrams ordered in a highly structured and artificial way, and that this pattern codified the nature of time's flow in the world. With the degrees of difference as numerical values, McKenna worked out a mathematical wave form based on the 384 lines of change that make up the 64 hexagrams. He was able to graph the data and this became the Novelty Time Wave.

Peter J. Meyer (Peter Johann Gustav Meyer) (born 1946), in collaboration with McKenna, studied and developed novelty theory, working out a mathematical formula and developing the Timewave Zero software (the original version of which was completed by July 1987), enabling them to graph and explore its dynamics on a computer. The graph was fractal: It exhibited a pattern in which a given small section of the wave was found to be identical in form to a larger section of the wave. McKenna called this fractal modeling of time "temporal resonance", proposing it implied that larger intervals, occurring long ago, contained the same amount of information as shorter, more recent, intervals. He suggested the up-and-down oscillation of the wave shows an ongoing wavering between habit and novelty respectively. With each successive iteration trending, at an increasing level, towards infinite novelty. So according to novelty theory, the pattern of time itself is speeding up, with a requirement of the theory being that infinite novelty will be reached on a specific date.

McKenna believed that events in history could be identified that would help him locate the time wave end date and attempted to find the best-fit of the graph to the data field of human history. The last harmonic of the wave has a duration of 67.29 years. Population growth, peak oil, and pollution statistics were some of the factors that pointed him to an early twenty-first century end date and when looking for a particularly novel event in human history as a signal that the final phase had begun McKenna picked the dropping of the atomic bomb on Hiroshima. This adjusted his graph to reach zero in mid-November 2012. When he later discovered that the end of the 13th baktun in the Maya calendar had been correlated by Western Maya scholars as December 21, 2012, he adopted their end date instead.

McKenna saw the universe, in relation to novelty theory, as having a teleological attractor at the end of time, which increases interconnectedness and would eventually reach a singularity of infinite complexity. He also frequently referred to this as "the transcendental object at the end of time." When describing this model of the universe he stated that: "The universe is not being pushed from behind. The universe is being pulled from the future toward a goal that is as inevitable as a marble reaching the bottom of a bowl when you release it up near the rim. If you do that, you know the marble will roll down the side of the bowl, down, down, down – until eventually it comes to rest at the lowest energy state, which is the bottom of the bowl. That's precisely my model of human history. I'm suggesting that the universe is pulled toward a complex attractor that exists ahead of us in time, and that our ever-accelerating speed through the phenomenal world of connectivity and novelty is based on the fact that we are now very, very close to the attractor." Therefore, according to McKenna's final interpretation of the data and positioning of the graph, on December 21, 2012, we would have been in the unique position in time where maximum novelty would be experienced. An event he described as a "concrescence", a "tightening 'gyre'" with everything flowing together. Speculating that "when the laws of physics are obviated, the universe disappears, and what is left is the tightly bound plenum, the monad, able to express itself for itself, rather than only able to cast a shadow into physis as its reflection...It will be the entry of our species into 'hyperspace', but it will appear to be the end of physical laws, accompanied by the release of the mind into the imagination."

Novelty theory is considered to be pseudoscience. Among the criticisms are the use of numerology to derive dates of important events in world history, the arbitrary rather than calculated end date of the time wave and the apparent adjustment of the eschaton from November 2012 to December 2012 in order to coincide with the Maya calendar. Other purported dates do not fit the actual time frames: the date claimed for the emergence of Homo sapiens is inaccurate by 70,000 years, and the existence of the ancient Sumer and Egyptian civilisations contradict the date he gave for the beginning of "historical time". Some projected dates have been criticized for having seemingly arbitrary labels, such as the "height of the age of mammals" and McKenna's analysis of historical events has been criticised for having a eurocentric and cultural bias.

The Watkins Objection
The British mathematician Matthew Watkins of Exeter University conducted a mathematical analysis of the Time Wave, and claimed there were mathematical flaws in its construction.

Critical reception

Judy Corman, vice president of the Phoenix House of New York, attacked McKenna for popularizing "dangerous substances". In a 1993 letter to The New York Times, he wrote that: "surely the fact that Terence McKenna says that the psilocybin mushroom 'is the megaphone used by an alien, intergalactic Other to communicate with mankind' is enough for us to wonder if taking LSD has done something to his mental faculties." The same year, in his True Hallucinations review for The New York Times, Peter Conrad wrote: "I suffered hallucinatory agonies of my own while reading his shrilly ecstatic prose".

Reviewing Food of the Gods, Richard Evans Schultes wrote in American Scientist that the book was "a masterpiece of research and writing" and that it "should be read by every specialist working in the multifarious fields involved with the use of psychoactive drugs." Concluding that, "[i]t is, without question, destined to play a major role in our future considerations of the role of the ancient use of psychoactive drugs, the historical shaping of our modern concerns about drugs and perhaps about man's desire for escape from reality with drugs."

In 1994, Tom Hodgkinson wrote for The New Statesman and Society, that "to write him off as a crazy hippie is a rather lazy approach to a man not only full of fascinating ideas but also blessed with a sense of humor and self-parody".

In a 1992 issue of Esquire Magazine, Mark Jacobson wrote of True Hallucinations that, "it would be hard to find a drug narrative more compellingly perched on a baroquely romantic limb than this passionate Tom-and-Huck-ride-great-mother-river-saga of brotherly bonding," adding "put simply, Terence is a hoot!"

Wired called him a "charismatic talking head" who was "brainy, eloquent, and hilarious" and Jerry Garcia of the Grateful Dead also said that he was "the only person who has made a serious effort to objectify the psychedelic experience."

Bibliography

Spoken word
 History Ends in Green: Gaia, Psychedelics and the Archaic Revival, 6 audiocassette set, Mystic Fire audio, 1993,  (recorded at the Esalen Institute, 1989)
 TechnoPagans at the End of History (transcription of rap with Mark Pesce from 1998)
 Psychedelics in the Age of Intelligent Machines (1999) (DVD) HPX/SurrealStudio
 Conversations on the Edge of Magic (1994) (CD & Cassette) ACE
 Rap-Dancing into the Third Millennium (1994) (Cassette) (Re-issued on CD as The Quintessential Hallucinogen) ACE
 Packing For the Long Strange Trip (1994) (Audio Cassette) ACE
 Global Perspectives and Psychedelic Poetics (1994) (Cassette) Sound Horizons Audio-Video, Inc.
 The Search for the Original Tree of Knowledge (1992) (Cassette) Sounds True
 The Psychedelic Society (DVD & Video Cassette) Sound Photosynthesis
 True Hallucinations Workshop (Audio/Video Cassette) Sound Photosynthesis
 The Vertigo at History's Edge: Who Are We? Where Have We Come From? Where Are We Going? (DVD & Video/Audio Cassette) Sound Photosynthesis
 Ethnobotany and Shamanism (DVD & Video/Audio Cassette) Sound Photosynthesis
 Shamanism, Symbiosis and Psychedelics Workshop (Audio/Video Cassette) Sound Photosynthesis
 Shamanology (Audio Cassette) Sound Photosynthesis
 Shamanology of the Amazon (w/ Nicole Maxwell) (Audio/Video Cassette) Sound Photosynthesis
 Beyond Psychology (1983) (Audio Cassette) Sound Photosynthesis
 Understanding & the Imagination in the Light of Nature Parts 1 & 2 (DVD & Video/Audio Cassette) Sound Photosynthesis
 Ethnobotany (a complete course given at The California Institute of Integral Studies) (Audio Cassette) Sound Photosynthesis
 Non-ordinary States of Reality Through Vision Plants (Audio Cassette) Sound Photosynthesis
 Mind & Time, Spirit & Matter: The Complete Weekend in Santa Fe (Audio/Video Cassette) Sound Photosynthesis
 Forms and Mysteries: Morphogenetic Fields and Psychedelic Experiences (w/ Rupert Sheldrake) (DVD & Video/Audio Cassette) Sound Photosynthesis
 UFO: The Inside Outsider (DVD & Video/Audio Cassette) Sound Photosynthesis
 A Calendar for The Goddess (DVD & Video/Audio Cassette) Sound Photosynthesis
 A Magical Journey: Including Hallucinogens and Culture, Time and The I Ching, and The Human Future (Video Cassette) TAP/Sound Photosynthesis
 Aliens and Archetypes (Video Cassette) TAP/Sound Photosynthesis
 Angels, Aliens and Archetypes 1987 Symposium: Shamanic Approaches to the UFO, and Fairmont Banquet Talk (DVD & Video/Audio Cassette) Sound Photosynthesis
 Botanical Dimensions (Audio Cassette) Sound Photosynthesis
 Conference on Botanical Intelligence (w/ Joan Halifax, Andy Weil, & Dennis McKenna) (Audio Cassette) Sound Photosynthesis
 Coping With Gaia's Midwife Crisis (Audio Cassette) Sound Photosynthesis
 Dreaming Awake at the End of Time (DVD & Video/Audio Cassette) Sound Photosynthesis
 Evolving Times (DVD, CD & Video/Audio Cassette) Sound Photosynthesis
 Food of the Gods (Audio/Video Cassette) Sound Photosynthesis
 Food of the Gods 2: Drugs, Plants and Destiny (Video Cassette) Sound Photosynthesis
 Hallucinogens in Shamanism & Anthropology at Bridge Psychedelic Conf.1991 (w/ Ralph Metzner, Marlene Dobkin De Rios, Allison Kennedy & Thomas Pinkson) (Audio Cassette) Sound Photosynthesis
 Finale – Bridge Psychedelic Conf.1991 (Audio/Video Cassette) Sound Photosynthesis
 Man and Woman at the End of History (w/ Riane Eisler) (Audio Cassette) Sound Photosynthesis
 Plants, Consciousness, and Transformation (1995) (Audio Cassette) Sound Photosynthesis
 Metamorphosis (w/ Rupert Sheldrake & Ralph Abraham) (1995) (Video Cassette) Mystic Fire/Sound Photosynthesis
 Nature is the Center of the Mandala (Audio Cassette) Sound Photosynthesis
 Opening the Doors of Creativity (1990) (DVD & Video/Audio Cassette) Sound Photosynthesis
 Places I Have Been (CD & Audio Cassette) Sound Photosynthesis
 Plants, Visions and History Lecture (Audio/Video Cassette) Sound Photosynthesis
 Psychedelics Before and After History (DVD & Video/Audio Cassette) Sound Photosynthesis
 Sacred Plants As Guides: New Dimensions of the Soul (at the Jung Society Clairemont, California) (DVD & Video/Audio Cassette) Sound Photosynthesis
 Seeking the Stone (Video Cassette) Sound Photosynthesis
 Shamanism: Before and Beyond History – A Weekend at Ojai (w/ Ralph Metzner) (Audio/Video Cassette) Sound Photosynthesis
 Shedding the Monkey (Audio Cassette) Sound Photosynthesis
 State of the Stone '95 (Audio Cassette) Sound Photosynthesis
 The Ethnobotany of Shamanism Introductory Lecture: The Philosophical Implications of Psychobotony: Past, Present and Future (at CIIS) (Audio/Video Cassette) Sound Photosynthesis
 The Ethnobotany of Shamanism Workshop: Psychedelics Before and After History (at CIIS) (Audio Cassette) Sound Photosynthesis
 The Grammar of Ecstasy – the World Within the Word (Audio Cassette) Sound Photosynthesis
 The Light at the End of History (Audio/Video Cassette) Sound Photosynthesis
 The State of the Stone Address: Having Archaic and Eating it Too (Audio Cassette) Sound Photosynthesis
 The Taxonomy of Illusion (at UC Santa Cruz) (DVD & Video/Audio Cassette) Sound Photosynthesis
 This World ...and Its Double (DVD & Video/Audio Cassette) Sound Photosynthesis
 Trialogues at the Edge of the Millennium (w/ Rupert Sheldrake & Ralph Abraham) (at UC Santa Cruz) (1998) (Video Cassette) Trialogue Press

Discography
 Re : Evolution with The Shamen (1992)
 Dream Matrix Telemetry with Zuvuya (1993)
 Alien Dreamtime with Spacetime Continuum & Stephen Kent (2003)
 "Reclaim Your Mind" with Mark Pontius (2020)

Filmography

 Experiment at Petaluma (1990)
 Prague Gnosis: Terence McKenna Dialogues (1992)
 The Hemp Revolution (1995)
 Terence McKenna: The Last Word (1999)
 Shamans of the Amazon (2001)
 Alien Dreamtime (2003)
 2012: The Odyssey (2007)
 The Alchemical Dream: Rebirth of the Great Work (2008)
 Manifesting the Mind (2009)
 Cognition Factor (2009)
 DMT: The Spirit Molecule (2010)
 2012: Time for Change (2010)
 The Terence McKenna OmniBus (2012)
 The Transcendental Object at the End of Time (2014)
 Terence McKenna's True Hallucinations (2016)

See also

 Benny Shanon
 David E. Nichols
 Exopheromone
 Jeremy Narby
 Jonathan Ott
 Luis Eduardo Luna
 Omega Point
 Rick Strassman

Notes

References

External links

 
 Botanical Dimensions
 
 Erowid's Terence McKenna Vault
 
 Psychedelic Salon, Over 100 podcasts of Terence McKenna lectures
 Tao of Terence , a 12-part series of essays on McKenna by Tao Lin at Vice
 Terence McKenna Bibliography , list of references to books, articles, audio, video, interviews and translations by and about Terence McKenna
 Terrence McKenna's True Hallucinations Documentary by Peter Bergmann
 The Transcendental Object At The End Of Time Documentary by Peter Bergmann

1946 births
2000 deaths
2012 phenomenon believers
20th-century alchemists
20th-century American writers
20th-century American historians
American alchemists
American book and manuscript collectors
American cannabis activists
American religious skeptics
American people of Irish descent
Antelope Valley High School alumni
Counterculture festivals activists
Deaths from brain cancer in the United States
Deaths from cancer in Hawaii
Ethnobotanists
20th-century mystics
People from Occidental, California
People from Paonia, Colorado
American psychedelic drug advocates
Psychedelic drug researchers
Public orators